Yvonne Buter (born 18 March 1959 in Schiedam) is a former Dutch field hockey goalkeeper, who won the bronze medal with the National Women's Team at the 1988 Summer Olympics.

From 1985 to 1988 she played a total number of 29 international matches for Holland. Buter, a stand-in for first choice Det de Beus, retired after the 1988 Summer Olympics in South Korea.

External links
 
 Dutch Hockey Federation

1959 births
Living people
Dutch female field hockey players
Female field hockey goalkeepers
Field hockey players at the 1988 Summer Olympics
Olympic bronze medalists for the Netherlands
Olympic field hockey players of the Netherlands
Olympic medalists in field hockey
Sportspeople from Schiedam
Medalists at the 1988 Summer Olympics
20th-century Dutch women
21st-century Dutch women